District council may refer to:
A branch of local government in the United Kingdom:
Supervising one of the Districts of England:
A Metropolitan borough
A Non-metropolitan district
A Unitary authority
Supervising one of the Principal Areas of Wales
Supervising one of the Subdivisions of Scotland
Supervising one of the Districts of Northern Ireland
A branch of  local government in the Australian state of South Australia
One of the District Councils of Bangladesh
One of the District Councils of Hong Kong
District Council (First), a former functional constituency in the elections for the Legislative Council of Hong Kong
District Council (Second), a former functional constituency in the elections for the Legislative Council of Hong Kong
One of the District Councils of India
One of the Districts of New Zealand
One of the District People's Congresses of the municipalities or prefectural-level cities of the People's Republic of China
Council of the District of Columbia, local government of District of Columbia
A Labour council at a district level